

Plants

Cnidarians

Arthropods

Bryozoans

Brachiopods

Molluscs

Echinoderms

Conodonts

Fishes

Amphibians

Research
 Laloy et al. (2013) reinterpret the Eocene frog species Rana cadurcorum from the Quercy Phosphorites (France) as a junior synonym of Thaumastosaurus gezei.

Newly named temnospondyls

Newly named lepospondyls

Newly named lissamphibians

Turtles

Research
 A study on the anatomy of the brain and inner ear of the Jurassic turtle Plesiochelys etalloni is published by Paulina Carabajal et al. (2013).

Newly named turtles

Thalattosaurs

Ichthyopterygians

Lepidosauromorphs

Newly named sauropterygians

Newly named rhynchocephalians

Newly named lizards

Newly named snakes

Archosauromorphs

Newly named basal archosauromorphs

Archosaurs

Other reptiles

Synapsids

Non-mammalian synapsids

Research
 The postcranial skeleton of therocephalian Ictidosuchoides is described by Heidi Fourie (2013).

New taxa

Mammals

Other animals

Other organisms

References

 
2010s in paleontology
Paleontology